Nogometni klub Fužinar, commonly referred to as NK Fužinar or simply Fužinar, is a Slovenian football club from Ravne na Koroškem which plays in the Slovenian Second League under the sponsorship name Fužinar Vzajemci. The club was founded in 1937.

History
The club was founded in August 1937 as SK Slovan Guštanj. They joined subassociation competitions in the 1939–40 season and won the second tier Koroška group ahead of their neighbors SK Mislinja. In the next year, they played in Maribor League West, but the season was interrupted because of the outbreak of World War II in Yugoslavia. After the war they first competed as a football section of Partizan Guštanj, but then formed ŠD Fužinar in 1947. They again played in Maribor subassociation leagues until 1950, when they qualified for SR Slovenia second division. Fužinar finished dead last and immediately returned to local level.

Their biggest success in the time of SFR Yugoslavia came in the 1965–66 season, when they played on a new stadium in newly-formed Slovenian Zonal League East and finished second. Therefore they played in qualifiers for the Slovenian Republic League with Svoboda, but lost 6–4 on aggregate. After that Fužinar continued playing in zonal and regional leagues until 1988, but they never came close to promotion again. There was also an attempt of merging all the clubs from the region under the name of Koroška in the 1979–80 season, but the short-lived project proved to be unsuccessful.

After Slovenia's independence in 1991, they found themselves in the lowest possible league and the club was reorganized as KNK Fužinar in the mid-1990s. They qualified for the Slovenian Third League in 1999, but were soon relegated again. Their climb started in 2012, when former top division player Niko Podvinski came to the club as player/manager, and the club gained promotion from fifth to third division in two years. In 2017 they finished third, but the champions Maribor B declined promotion, so Fužinar was promoted to the Slovenian Second League for the first time in the club's history.

Honours
Slovenian Fourth Division
 Winners: 1998–99, 2001–02, 2013–14

Slovenian Fifth Division
 Winners: 2012–13

Slovenian Sixth Division
 Winners: 2010–11

MNZ Maribor Cup
 Winners: 2014–15

References

External links
Official website 

Association football clubs established in 1937
Football clubs in Slovenia
1937 establishments in Slovenia